Eduard Andreevich Stoeckl (1804 in Constantinople – January 26, 1892 in Paris) was a Russian diplomat best known today for having negotiated the American purchase of Alaska on behalf of the Russian government.

Personal life 
He was son of Andreas von Stoeckl, Austrian diplomat in Constantinople, and Maria Pisani, daughter of Nicolas Pisani, Russian dragoman in Constantinople.

Career 

In 1850 he became chargé d'affaires of the Russian embassy in Washington, and in 1854 held the post of minister, vacant after death of Aleksandr Bodisko. Like his predecessor, Stoeckl married an American woman, Elisa Howard.

Stoeckl established close friendly relations with many American officials and politicians, including the senator and the future Secretary of State William H. Seward, with whom he would later negotiate the Alaska purchase.

Stoeckl advocated the sale of Alaska (then known as Russian America) to the United States, asserting that this would prevent the United Kingdom from seizing the territory in case of war between the two countries and would allow Russia to concentrate its resources on Eastern Siberia, particularly the Amur River area. He also insisted that by doing so, Russia would avoid any future conflict with the United States, viewing further U.S. expansion in North America as inevitable.

Later life

Stoeckl signed the Alaska Treaty in March 1867. For successfully carrying out the negotiation, Tsar Alexander II rewarded him with US$25,000 and an annual pension of $6,000.

Due to declining health, Stoeckl resigned in 1869. He spent the final years of his life in France and died in Paris on January 26, 1892.

In fiction 
Eduard de Stoeckl is a character in the historical novel Forty-Ninth by Boris Pronsky and Craig Britton.

Bibliography
 Marie de Testa & Antoine Gautier, Le diplomate russe Eduard de Stoeckl (ca 1805-1892) et la cession de l'Alaska aux Etats-Unis, in Drogmans et diplomates européens auprès de la Porte ottomane, éditions ISIS, Istanbul, 2003, pp. 463–469.

References 

1804 births
1892 deaths
Diplomats of the Russian Empire
Russian America